Josef Christian Holsner (11 February 1894 – 12 October 1969) was a Swedish middle-distance runner. He competed in the men's 3000 metres steeplechase at the 1920 Summer Olympics.

References

1894 births
1969 deaths
Athletes (track and field) at the 1920 Summer Olympics
Swedish male middle-distance runners
Swedish male steeplechase runners
Olympic athletes of Sweden
Place of birth missing